Eryngium pinnatifidum, commonly known as blue devils, is a species of plant in the family Apiaceae. It is endemic to the south-west of Western Australia. It grows up to 50 cm in height and produces blue or white flowers between August and November (late winter to late spring) in its native range.

The species was first formally described by botanist Alexander von Bunge, his description published in 1845 in  Plantae Preissianae.

References

Apiales of Australia
Eudicots of Western Australia
pinnatifidum
Plants described in 1845
Taxa named by Alexander von Bunge